The black-spotted leaf-toed gecko or scarce ground gecko (Dixonius melanostictus) is a species of lizard in the family Gekkonidae. It is endemic to Thailand.

References

Geckos of Thailand
Endemic fauna of Thailand
M
Reptiles described in 1962
Taxonomy articles created by Polbot